The Monaco national badminton team represents Monaco in international badminton team competitions. The Monegasque national team have never competed in any international team event.

History 
The national team was formed in 2010 after the establishment of Federation Monegasque de Badminton (FMBAD). The Monegasque team became a member of Badminton Europe in 2013 and the Badminton World Federation in 2014.

In 2018, the Monegasque team was scheduled to compete in the inaugural edition of the European Small States Badminton Games in 2020. The games were organized by eight national teams from Badminton Europe. However, the team did not compete after the tournament was scrapped after coinciding with COVID-19 restrictions during the COVID-19 pandemic in 2020.

Current squad 
The following players were selected to represent Monaco in international tournaments.

Male players
Hervé Morand
Quentin Blanchet
Antony Ganachau
Yann Lemaire
Arnaud Cotta
Joseph de Stefano
Quentin Sassone Castillo
Nolhan Riautet

Female players
Thien Tran
Nora Chelabi
Lélia Dumoulin
Julia Albou

References 

Badminton
National badminton teams